Bedfordshire Greensand Ridge is an escarpment which runs through Buckinghamshire, Bedfordshire, and Cambridgeshire in the south and east of England. A pathway runs along the ridge from Leighton Buzzard to Gamlingay.
In 2009, the Greensand Ridge Local Action Group was formed to help enhance and develop the Greensand Ridge area. The Group bid for funding from the Rural Development Programme for England and were successful. Since 2009, the Greensand Ridge Rural Development Programme, delivered by Bedfordshire Rural Communities Charity, has awarded grants to businesses and organisations which meet their objectives.

See also
 Greensand Ridge, a similarly named ridge in Surrey, Sussex and Kent

References

 Natural England - Bedfordshire Greensand Ridge
 Defra: JCA 090: Bedfordshire Greensand Ridge

External links
 Greensand Ridge Path 
 Greensand Ridge Walk
  Details about the Greensand Ridge Local Action Group and funding

Escarpments of England
Long-distance footpaths in England
Natural regions of England
Footpaths in Buckinghamshire
Footpaths in Bedfordshire
Footpaths in Cambridgeshire
Landforms of Buckinghamshire 
Landforms of Bedfordshire
Landforms of Cambridgeshire
Ridges of England